William Aloysius Foxen (May 31, 1879 in Tenafly, New Jersey – April 17, 1937 in Brooklyn, New York) was a professional baseball pitcher. He played in Major League Baseball from 1908 to 1911 for the Chicago Cubs and Philadelphia Phillies.

External links

1879 births
1937 deaths
Chicago Cubs players
Philadelphia Phillies players
Major League Baseball pitchers
Baseball players from New Jersey
Brockton Whalers players
New Bedford Whalers (baseball) players
Hartford Senators players
Jersey City Skeeters players
New Orleans Pelicans (baseball) players
Birmingham Barons players
Atlanta Crackers players
Richmond Colts players
Saint Peter's Peacocks baseball players
People from Tenafly, New Jersey
Sportspeople from Bergen County, New Jersey